{{DISPLAYTITLE:Conway group Co2}}

In the area of modern algebra known as group theory, the Conway group Co2 is a sporadic simple group of order
   218365371123
 = 42305421312000
 ≈ 4.

History and properties
It is thus a subgroup of Co0. It is isomorphic to a subgroup of Co1. The direct product 2×Co2 is maximal in Co0.

The Schur multiplier and the outer automorphism group are both trivial.

Representations 

Co2 acts as a rank 3 permutation group on 2300 points. These points can be identified with planar hexagons in the Leech lattice having 6 type 2 vertices.

Co2 acts on the 23-dimensional even integral lattice with no roots of determinant 4, given as a sublattice of the Leech lattice orthogonal to a norm 4 vector. Over the field with 2 elements it has a 22-dimensional faithful representation; this is the smallest faithful representation over any field.

 showed that if a finite group has an absolutely irreducible faithful rational representation of dimension 23 and has no subgroups of index 23 or 24 then it is contained in either Z/2Z × Co2 or Z/2Z × Co3.

The Mathieu group M23 is isomorphic to a maximal subgroup of Co2 and one representation, in permutation matrices, fixes the type 2 vector u = (-3,123). A block sum ζ of the involution η =

and 5 copies of -η also fixes the same vector. Hence Co2 has a convenient matrix representation inside the standard representation of Co0. The trace of ζ is -8, while the involutions in M23 have trace 8.

A 24-dimensional block sum of η and -η is in Co0 if and only if the number of copies of η is odd.

Another representation fixes the vector v = (4,-4,022). A monomial and maximal subgroup includes a representation of M22:2, where any α interchanging the first 2 co-ordinates restores v by then negating the vector. Also included are diagonal involutions corresponding to octads (trace 8), 16-sets (trace -8), and dodecads (trace 0). It can be shown that Co2 has just 3 conjugacy classes of involutions. η leaves (4,-4,0,0) unchanged; the block sum ζ provides a non-monomial generator completing this representation of Co2.

There is an alternate way to construct the stabilizer of v. Now u and u+v = (1,-3,122) are vertices of a 2-2-2 triangle (vide infra). Then u, u+v, v, and their negatives form a coplanar hexagon fixed by ζ and M22; these generate a group Fi21 ≈ U6(2). α (vide supra) extends this to Fi21:2, which is maximal in Co2. Lastly, Co0 is transitive on type 2 points, so that a 23-cycle fixing u has a conjugate fixing v, and the generation is completed.

Maximal subgroups 
Some maximal subgroups fix or reflect 2-dimensional sublattices of the Leech lattice. It is usual to define these planes by h-k-l triangles: triangles including the origin as a vertex, with edges (differences of vertices) being vectors of types h, k, and l.

 found the 11 conjugacy classes of maximal subgroups of Co2 as follows:

 Fi21:2 ≈ U6(2):2 - symmetry/reflection group of coplanar hexagon of 6 type 2 points. Fixes one hexagon in a rank 3 permutation representation of Co2 on 2300 such hexagons. Under this subgroup the hexagons are split into orbits of 1, 891, and 1408. Fi21 fixes a 2-2-2 triangle defining the plane.
 210:M22:2 has monomial representation described above; 210:M22 fixes a 2-2-4 triangle.
 McL fixes a 2-2-3 triangle.
 21+8:Sp6(2) - centralizer of involution class 2A (trace -8)
 HS:2 fixes a 2-3-3 triangle or exchanges its type 3 vertices with sign change.
 (24 × 21+6).A8
 U4(3):D8
 24+10.(S5 × S3)
 M23 fixes a 2-3-4 triangle.
 31+4.21+4.S5
 51+2:4S4

Conjugacy classes
Traces of matrices in a standard 24-dimensional representation of Co2 are shown. The names of conjugacy classes are taken from the Atlas of Finite Group Representations. 

Centralizers of unknown structure are indicated with brackets.

References 
 

 Reprinted in 

 

Specific

External links 
 MathWorld: Conway Groups
 Atlas of Finite Group Representations: Co2 version 2
 Atlas of Finite Group Representations: Co2 version 3

Sporadic groups
John Horton Conway